Anthony Messado (born July 24, 1974), better known by the stage name Hanz On or Hannibal The Great, is an American rapper and an affiliate of the Wu-Tang Clan. He released his solo debut, Out Of Chef's Kitchen in 2010, and has since co-founded a record label called Hanz On Music. He is closely tied to another Wu-Tang Clan affiliate named Carlton Fisk.

Music career

Out Of Chef's Kitchen 
Hanz On released his debut album, Out Of Chef's Kitchen, after signing to Ice Water Inc. in 2010. He had previously been a part of Ice Water and featured on their debut crew and compilation albums. The solo album contained verses from Raekwon, Inspectah Deck, and Busta Rhymes among others.

In August 2009, Hanz attained notoriety after an incident during that year's Rock The Bells festival. Hanz punched rapper Joe Budden in the face because of a feud that Budden had with Raekwon and other members of the Wu Tang Clan.

Hanz On Music, Back to Sicily Mixtape, and Method Man Presents: Hannibal The Great 
In 2012, Hanz On partnered with Staten Island businessman Ettore Mazzei to launch record label Hanz On Music, formally leaving Ice Water Inc. In late 2012 it was announced that the new label's first release would be the "Back to Sicily Mixtape" hosted by DJ Kay Slay. Back To Sicily featured appearances from Method Man and Inspectah Deck. A music video for lead single We Did It was produced in September 2012. Hanz On's second solo LP titled Method Man Presents: Hannibal The Great was released in 2013 and featured Method Man, Ghostface Killah, and Inspectah Deck.

Discography 
Studio albums
 2010: Out Of Chef's Kitchen
 2013: Method Man Presents: Hannibal The Great
 2017: Barca

Mixtapes
 2012: Back to Sicily Mixtape

Collaborations
 2007: Raekwon's "Ice Water - Polluted Water"
 2009: Raekwon "BabyGrande Recordings"

References

External links

Living people
People from Staten Island
Rappers from New York City
1974 births
21st-century American rappers